The Biggest Winner Arab (season 3) is the third season of the Arabic version of the original NBC American reality television series The Biggest Loser. The third season premiered on October 11, 2008.

Contestants

Teams
 Member of Noor's Team
 Member of Lina's Team
Winners
 250,000 SAR. Winner (among the finalists)
 50,000 SAR. Winner (among the eliminated contestants)

Weigh-ins and eliminations

Game
 Week's Biggest Winner
 Gain weight
 did not attend
Winners
 250,000 SAR Winner (among the finalists)
 50,000 SAR Winner (among the eliminated contestants)
BMI
 Normal (18.5 - 24.9 BMI)
 Overweight (25 - 29.9 BMI)
 Obese Class I (30 - 34.9 BMI)
 Obese Class II (35 - 39.9 BMI)
 Obese Class III (greater than 40 BMI)

Notes
 All contestant weights are in kilograms
 All contestant heights are in centimetres

Weight Loss History

Voting History

 Not in elimination, unable to vote
 Vote not revealed
 Immunity
 Below yellow line, unable to vote
Notes
 * Although Mohammad M was voted out, he was allowed to stay because he had a safe card, and Amr was eliminated.

Lebanese television series
2008 Lebanese television seasons
2009 Lebanese television seasons
2000s Lebanese television series
The Biggest Loser